Terek is a village in Osh Region of Kyrgyzstan. It is part of the Alay District. Its population was 1,576 in 2021.

Nearby towns and villages include Sopu-Korgon (3 miles), Jerge-Tal (4 miles) and Askaly (5 miles).

References

External links 
 Satellite map at Maplandia.com

Populated places in Osh Region